Vespinitocris is a genus of longhorn beetles of the subfamily Lamiinae, containing the following species:

subgenus Ichneumonitocris
 Vespinitocris ichneumon (Hintz, 1919)

subgenus Vespinitocris
 Vespinitocris camerunica Breuning, 1956
 Vespinitocris dux (Jordan, 1894)
 Vespinitocris morio (Jordan, 1903)
 Vespinitocris sessensis Breuning, 1950
 Vespinitocris tavakiliani Sudre & Téocchi, 2005

References

Saperdini